Prof. Dilip Kumar Choudhary is an Indian politician from Darbhanga Graduate Constituency in Bihar. He was a Member of the Bihar Legislative Council two times, since 2007 and 2014. From the year 1990 to 2002, he was a councillor of Darbhanga Municipal Corporation. He completed his master's degree in chemistry subject from Lalit Narayan Mithila University and Ph.D. from Allahabad University. Choudhary is a professor of chemistry in Chandradhari Mithila Vigyan Mahavidyalaya at Lalit Narayan Mithila University, Darbhanga. Since February 2022, he is also principal of C.M. Science College along with the charge of C. M. Law College, Darbhanga. Choudhary was born in Darbhanga district of Bihar in Brahman family. His father, Late Dr. Nilambar  Chaudhary was also a Senior Leader of the Indian National Congress and a member of the Bihar Legislative Council multiple times from Darbhanga Graduate Constituency.

Political career 
Choudhary elected from Darbhanga (Graduate Constituency) as an Indian National Congress Supported candidate In 2007 and 2014. From the year 1990 to 2002, he was a councillor of Darbhanga Municipal Corporation. Working as General Secretary in Lalit Narayan Mithila University (Sangh) Shikshak Sangh and Bihar State University (Sangh) Shikshak Mahasangh, as well as in Lalit Narayan Mithila University and Kameshwar Singh Darbhanga Sanskrit University for 10 years elected unopposed member in the Syndicate and lifetime Senate Member of both Varsity. As a member of various committees of both Varsity and constantly trying to solve the problems of teachers and employees. In student life, he was active in student politics and Student union elections under the banner of NSUI. In 2018, he left the Indian National Congress and joined Janta Dal United. Presently, as a member of Janata Dal United, actively contributing to social and political work.

References 
https://www.biharvidhanparishad.gov.in/Members/DilipKrChoudhary.htm
President of India President of India
https://news4nation.com/news/dr-dilip-chaudhery-ne-kiya-namankan-721615
https://www.prabhatkhabar.com/state/bihar/patna/bihar-mlc-election-date-2020-jdu-candidates-neeraj-devesh-and-dilip-chaudhary-asj
https://economictimes.indiatimes.com/news/politics-and-nation/former-bihar-congress-chief-3-other-mlcs-join-jdu/articleshow/63127435.cms?from=mdr
https://pib.gov.in/PressReleasePage.aspx?PRID=1659102
https://www.financialexpress.com/india-news/in-nitish-kumar-vs-tejashwi-yadav-row-congress-supports-lalu-yadav-son/772903/

External links 
 
 

Choudhary, Dilip Kumar
Choudhary, Dilip Kumar
Choudhary, Dilip Kumar
Choudhary, Dilip Kumar
1964 births